Siavash Shafizadeh (born 30 March 1944) is an Iranian wrestler. He competed in the men's Greco-Roman bantamweight at the 1964 Summer Olympics.

References

1944 births
Living people
Iranian male sport wrestlers
Olympic wrestlers of Iran
Wrestlers at the 1964 Summer Olympics
Place of birth missing (living people)